The EJZ Bridge over Shoshone River is a Warren pony truss bridge located near Lovell, Wyoming, which carries Big Horn County Road CN9-111 (Cowley-Lovell Road) across the Shoshone River. Contractors McGuire and Blakeslee built the bridge from 1925 to 1926 using a design by the Wyoming Highway Department. The  bridge has four spans, the second-most of any truss bridge in Wyoming.

The bridge was added to the National Register of Historic Places on February 22, 1985. It was one of several bridges added to the National Register for their role in the history of Wyoming bridge construction.

See also
List of bridges documented by the Historic American Engineering Record in Wyoming

References

External links

Road bridges on the National Register of Historic Places in Wyoming
Bridges completed in 1926
Buildings and structures in Big Horn County, Wyoming
1926 establishments in Wyoming
Historic American Engineering Record in Wyoming
National Register of Historic Places in Big Horn County, Wyoming
Warren truss bridges in the United States